Big Fish Little Fish may refer to:

Big Fish, Little Fish (play), a 1961 Broadway play by Hugh Wheeler
"Big Fish Little Fish" (song), a 1998-2011 and 2004-2008 single for the children's television series Bob the Builder and ToddWorld